Roberto Horcades Figueira (born April 19, 1947, in Rio de Janeiro) is a Brazilian cardiologist. He is currently the chairman of Fluminense Football Club, and the vice-president of Clube dos 13.

References

1947 births
Living people
Brazilian football chairmen and investors
Fluminense FC
Brazilian cardiologists
Sportspeople from Rio de Janeiro (city)